The 2008 Football League Cup Final was a football match played on 24 February 2008. It was the first League Cup Final to be played at the new Wembley Stadium, and the first to be played in England since the old Wembley was demolished in 2000. The defending champions were Chelsea, who beat Arsenal in the 2007 Final at Cardiff's Millennium Stadium. The final was contested by Tottenham Hotspur, who beat Arsenal 6–2 on aggregate in the semi-final, and Chelsea, who beat Everton 3–1 on aggregate. Tottenham Hotspur defeated Chelsea 2–1, after extra time, winning their first trophy in nine years.

Chelsea took the lead in the 39th minute through a Didier Drogba free kick. This goal made Drogba the first player to score in three League Cup Finals, having also done so in 2005 and 2007. A Wayne Bridge handball gave Tottenham a 68th-minute penalty, and Bulgarian Dimitar Berbatov converted from the spot. Three minutes into extra time, Jonathan Woodgate headed a Jermaine Jenas free kick onto Petr Čech, who in turn pushed it straight back onto Woodgate's head to score the winning goal.

The win was an important one for Tottenham as they secured UEFA Cup qualification for the following season, something they would not have achieved in the Premier League, as they finished 11th. For Chelsea, it was the second of four competitions in which they would finish as runners-up that season, after they lost to Manchester United in the Community Shield and ended up finishing as runners-up to the same team in the Premier League and the UEFA Champions League.

As of 2023, the 2008 League Cup final win remains Tottenham’s last major trophy.

Road to Wembley

Match

Details

Statistics

Source: ESPN

Notes
Didier Drogba's goal made him the all-time leading scorer in League Cup Finals with four. He also became the first player to score in three League Cup finals and the first to score in three consecutive English domestic cup finals.

References

Cup Final
League Cup Final
2008
League Cup Final 2008
League Cup Final 2008
Football League Cup Final